Ellen Marsha Zavian (born June 15, 1963) is an American sports agent and attorney. She was the first National Football League (NFL) female attorney-agent. She is a professor of law at the George Washington University Law School. She is also the founder and owner of EZ Negotiation, a sports agency based in the Washington, D.C. area.

Early life and education 
Zavian was raised in Maywood, New Jersey. Zavian comes from an athletic family. Her father played basketball and her mother was a gymnast, while her older brother ran track and her older sister played softball. Zavian attended Maywood Elementary School and Hackensack High School. Zavian was a three-sport varsity athlete at Hackensack High School, participating in soccer, volleyball, as well as track and field. She was also a cheerleader. 

For her undergraduate education, Zavian attended the University of Maryland. She earned her Bachelor of Science degree in business management and marketing, graduating in 1985. Zavian continued her education at American University – Washington College of Law and earned her Juris Doctor degree in 1988.

Early career 
In the 1980s, Zavian worked at the Maryland racetracks' promotional departments (Pimlico, Freestate and Laurel) and the University of Maryland's Recreation Center.

Legal career 
In law school, she worked as an intern at the National Football League Players Association (NFLPA) during the 1987 NFL season players’ strike. Zavian worked under the supervision of NFL Hall of Famer Gene Upshaw, with her direct report to the economist, Michael Duberstein.

After graduating from law school, Zavian joined a Senior Management Group LLC law firm based near Philadelphia, Pennsylvania and run by sports agent, Brett Senior, where she represented professional athletes as their attorney/agent. Two years later, Zavian launched her own practice.

In 1990, at the age of 26, Zavian became the first female attorney/agent representing players and coaches in the NFL.

Her first client was John Booty, of the New York Jets and later the Washington Redskins and Phoenix Cardinals. Nearly twenty years later, Zavian's final professional football player client was Troy Brown, MVP of the New England Patriots. Throughout her career, Zavian also worked with Frank Reich, Steve Tasker, Erik McMillan and Tim Manoa, among many others.

Following several years of representing players and coaches, Zavian was then approached by United States women's national soccer team (USWNT) co-captains Julie Foudy and Carla Overbeck in late 1995 for help negotiating new contracts from the U.S. Soccer Federation for nine of the women soccer players, including Kristine Lilly and Mia Hamm. The terms of the contract stated that the women’s soccer team would only receive a bonus if they won gold at the 1996 Summer Olympics in Atlanta, while the men’s soccer team contract stated they would receive an Olympic bonus if they won bronze, silver or gold. Zavian advised Foudy and her teammates to cross out the contested clauses and then faxed the revised documents back to the Federation which prompted a players’ lockout.  Relying on her previous background with the National Football League Players Association’s 1987 NFL season players’ strike, Zavian and the U.S. women soccer players held out. By the early part of 1996, the Federation responded to the players’ requests agreeing that the women soccer team would receive bonuses if they won either gold, silver, or bronze at the Olympics. The collective bargaining agreement was also the first in women's sports to include a paid pregnancy leave clause. The agreements for two of the women soccer players who had small children also had a clause incorporating paid nannies.

By the early 2000s, Zavian found another group of players to represent namely those involved in skateboarding and breakdancing. She helped create the X-Game and Gravity Games extreme athletes (skateboarders, bmx’ers and inliners) and the break dancers player associations. Throughout her career, Zavian has represented a range of athletes from professional football players, soccer and softball players to skateboarders and break-dancers. Zavian has served as the Founding Executive Director of the Women’s National Team Players Association The Women’s National Team Softball Association, The United Professional Skateboarder Association (UPSA). She also created the United Breakin Association, a global association for competitive break dancers, and she was appointed to the USA Dance task force which ultimately sought and obtained approval from the International Olympic Committee to recognized break dancing in the 2024 Paris Olympics.

Zavian was appointed by FIFA to the FIFA Pro Bono Counsel group in 2019 and SafeSport International Board of Trustee in 2021.

In 2022, Zavian became the first General Counsel for USA Lacrosse, the governing body of lacrosse in the United States.

Journalism career 
Zavian has held several positions in the field of journalism. She served as an inaugural columnist for Conde Nast’s Street & Smith’s Sports Business Journal, covering the business of women’s sports.

In addition, she also was a columnist for Fairchild’s Branding magazine, covering the sports marketing, Pro Football Weekly, focusing on the business of the Pro Football Weekly and Bass Resource reporting on women.

She is Editor-in-chief for Esports and the Law and My Legal Bookie both of which focus on the legal issues within esports and gaming. In 2020, she became a Contributing Author in esports coverage for The Washington Post. Other writings and quotes of hers have appeared in Forbes, Sports Illustrated, The Guardian, Association of Corporate Counsel, and Sports Law Expert.

She has also made appearances on CNN, C-SPAN, and NPR.

Teaching career 
Zavian is currently a Professorial Lecturer in Law at George Washington School of Law. She also teaches students in the Sports Management MBA program at George Washington University.

Zavian has also taught at the University of Baltimore Law School, David A. Clarke School of Law, George Mason - Antonin Scalia Law School, and American University – Washington College of Law.

Awards 
1992, Zavian was awarded the New Jersey Achievement Award

1997, Zavian was awarded the Top 20 Most Powerful Women In Sports by the Women's Sports and Fitness Foundation.

2001, Zavian was named to the Jewish Community Center of Greater DC's Sports Hall of Fame.

Personal life
A resident of River Edge, New Jersey, she competes in marathons and triathlons and was a body builder.

References 

1963 births
Living people
American sports agents
Hackensack High School alumni
People from Maywood, New Jersey
People from River Edge, New Jersey
Sportspeople from Bergen County, New Jersey
Women sports agents
21st-century American women lawyers
21st-century American lawyers
20th-century American women lawyers
20th-century American lawyers
Lawyers from Washington, D.C.
George Washington University Law School faculty
New Jersey lawyers
American female bodybuilders
University of Maryland, College Park alumni
Washington College of Law alumni
American women sportswriters
Jewish American journalists
Jewish American attorneys
Jewish women writers